Pyaar Mohabbat Happy Lucky is an Indian animated television series directed by Amit Gaur and produced by Popcorn Animation Studios. It aired on ZeeQ from 2014 to 2017. It depicts two neighbours, Happy and Lucky, who live in the countryside with Pappu, Bunty and Builder. There is a happy relationship between Happy and Lucky, and there are plenty of jokes and teasing between the two main characters.

Characters

Main

Happy
Happy is one of the two main characters. He is a dog. He is blue in colour. He lives in the countryside in a blue house. He is afraid of ghosts. He often fights with Lucky, as he is more powerful. He owns a Nissan Tempo. He speaks Haryanvi (voiced by Manish Bhawan).

Lucky
Lucky is the second main character. He is a jackal. He is pink in colour. He also lives in the countryside in a yellow house. Like Happy he fears a Ghost. He plays pranks, especially on Happy. He always teases Happy and then gets beaten by him as he is smaller than him (voiced by Anamaya Verma).

Pappu
Pappu, also known as Pammi is the friend of Lucky. He is a fox. He is yellow in colour. He lives in the countryside with Lucky. He helps Lucky in teasing Happy, and is also beaten by Happy. (voiced by Vaibhav Thakkar).

Bunty
Bunty is a bull. He also lives in countryside. He is light blue in colour and has brown horns. He has a big chest. Bunty is tough for beating up Happy and Lucky, but they are still friends. He is seen playing various roles like policeman, security guard, bodyguard, librarian, king, etc. He speaks Punjabi.

Recurring

Tina
Tina is an orange coloured female fox. She has yellow coloured hair. Both Happy and Lucky try to impress her but they fail.

Episodes

See also

Collection of animated television series
 List of Indian animated television series
 List of American animated television series

Animated television series
 Bandbudh Aur Budbak
 Chimpoo Simpoo

References

2015 Indian television series debuts
2017 Indian television series endings
Indian children's animated adventure television series
Indian children's animated comedy television series
Animated television series about dogs
Fictional jackals
Animated television series about foxes
Fictional bulls